Tuncay Özilhan (born 9 July 1947) is a Turkish businessman and billionaire. He is the current chairman of the board of Anadolu Group, as well as the president of Anadolu Efes. He was also the president of TÜSİAD from 2001 to 2004. He is also chairman of the board of supermarket chain Kipa.

References

1947 births
Living people
Turkish businesspeople
Istanbul University alumni
Long Island University alumni